The Court of Appeal is a court of the second level of the judiciary in civil, criminal, commercial and administrative matters in the Principality of Monaco. The Court of Appeal judges on appeals of judgments delivered by the Court of First Instance. The Court of Appeal has a remarkable position in the Monegasque justice system due to its regulatory function, which is both judicial and legal. On the legal side, many of the Court’s judgments constitute law references establishing the Monegasque State of Law. On the judicial side, the Court contributes to guaranteeing that the institution of justice will comply both with law and professional ethics.

The Court was established in 1965 and is composed of a President, a Vice President and a maximum of two advisers.

Members 
As of 2021 Court of Appeal consists of the following members:

 President - Brigitte Grinda-Gambarini
 Vice President - Muriel Dorato-Chicouras
 Advisers:
 Sébastien Biancheri
 Françoise Carracha
 Sandrine Lefebvre
 Catherine Levy
 Claire Gillois-Ghera

References 

1965 establishments in Europe
Judiciaries
Courts and tribunals established in 1965
Law of Monaco